Bruno Pesaola (28 July 1925 – 29 May 2015) was a professional Italian Argentine football player and manager, who played as a winger. He is most famous for his time with Italian clubs Fiorentina and S.S.C. Napoli, as both a player and a manager.

He was nicknamed Petisso (little man).

References

External links

1925 births
2015 deaths
Footballers from Buenos Aires
Argentine footballers
Association football wingers
Italian footballers
Club Atlético River Plate footballers
Novara F.C. players
S.S.C. Napoli players
A.S. Roma players
S.S. Scafatese Calcio 1922 players
Argentine Primera División players
Serie A players
Argentine football managers
Argentine expatriate football managers
S.S.C. Napoli managers
Serie A managers
Italy international footballers
Panathinaikos F.C. managers
Argentine people of Italian descent
Italian football managers
Italian expatriate football managers